HSU or Hsu may refer to:

People
 Chinese surname Xu ( Xú and / Xǔ), written 'Hsu' when using Wade–Giles Romanization

Universities 
 Hakim Sabzevari University in Sabzevar, Iran
 Hang Seng University of Hong Kong
 Hardin–Simmons University in Abilene, Texas, United States
 Helmut Schmidt University in Hamburg, Germany
 Henderson State University in Arkadelphia, Arkansas, United States
 Humboldt State University in Arcata, California, United States
 Penn State Harrisburg in Middletown, Dauphin County, Pennsylvania, United States
 Hansung University in Seoul, South Korea

Other uses 
 Croatian Party of Pensioners (Hrvatska stranka umirovljenika), a political party
 Health Services Union, an Australian trade union
 Hero of the Soviet Union
 High Security Unit, a closed prison in Lexington, Kentucky, United States
 Hospitality Solutions United, a producer of RFID Electronic Locks for hotels (Keycard Locks)

See also
 Xu (disambiguation)